Thomas Kelley (born c. 1888) was an American football player and coach of football and basketball.  He served as the head football coach at Muhlenberg College (1911–1913), the Missouri School of Mines and Metallurgy—now the Missouri University of Science and Technology (1914), the University of Alabama  the University of Idaho  and the University of Missouri (1922), compiling a career college football coaching record of   Kelley was also the head basketball coach at Muhlenberg from 1912 to 1914 and Alabama for the 1916–17 season, tallying a career college basketball record of   In addition, he served as the athletic director at Idaho from 1920 to 1922.

Playing career
Kelley played college football at the University of Chicago as a tackle for the Maroons under head coach Amos Alonzo Stagg.

Coaching career
In 1915 at Alabama, Kelley coached only the first half of season (4–0) before he came down with typhoid fever.  Athletic director B. L. Noojin and former Alabama quarterback Farley Moody took over the head coaching duties for the remaining four games of the season. The 2–2 mark achieved in Kelly's absence is still credited to his record at Alabama 

Kelley served in the U.S. Army in World War I and returned to coaching as an assistant at Missouri in 1919. He moved west in March 1920 and accepted the dual position of athletic director and head football coach at Idaho; under his leadership the Vandals were admitted to the Pacific Coast Conference  In addition to his duties at the university, he was also the state's boxing commissioner. After two years in Moscow, Kelley accepted the position of head football coach at Missouri in June 1922 at a salary of $4,500 per year, but resigned prior to the completion of his first season.

Kelley also coached college basketball for three seasons, two at Muhlenberg College (1912–14) and one at Alabama  with an overall record of

Head coaching record

Football

References

Sources
 Groom, Winston. The Crimson Tide – An Illustrated History. Tuscaloosa: The University of Alabama Press, 2000. -.

1880s births
Year of death missing
American football tackles
Alabama Crimson Tide athletic directors
Alabama Crimson Tide football coaches
Alabama Crimson Tide men's basketball coaches
United States Army personnel of World War I
Chicago Maroons football players
Idaho Vandals athletic directors
Idaho Vandals football coaches
Missouri Tigers football coaches
Missouri S&T Miners football coaches
Muhlenberg Mules football coaches
Muhlenberg Mules men's basketball coaches